Bitter & Sweet Release Tour Final is the first live CD by singer Beni. The album contains a DVD with performed songs at the Akasaka Blitz hall on 15 December 2009.

Track list: DVD

Track list: CD

Charts

References

Albums recorded at Akasaka Blitz
Beni (singer) albums
2010 live albums
2010 video albums
Live video albums